The 1974 Montana State Bobcats football team was an American football team that represented Montana State University in the Big Sky Conference during the 1974 NCAA Division II football season. In their fourth season under head coach Sonny Holland, the Bobcats compiled a 7–4 record (4–2 against Big Sky opponents) and finished second in the Big Sky.

Schedule

References

Montana State
Montana State Bobcats football seasons
Montana State Bobcats football